Filippa is a Danish apple cultivar. The cultivar was created by a schoolgirl named Filippa Johannsen (1842 - 1930) in Hundstrup on the island of Funen.

Some sources say the apple originates in 1850; other sources say 1881.

Sonneruplund recommends this apple variety for private gardens, as it can be grown without the use of pesticides.

References 

Apple cultivars
Danish apples